Twenty 1 is the seventeenth studio album (and twenty-first overall) by the American band Chicago. Released on January 29, 1991, it was their first album of the 1990s. Twenty 1 spent eleven weeks on the American Billboard 200, peaking at position No. 66, and did not chart in the UK.

Production 
The production of Twenty 1 saw a significant personnel reconfiguration. The recent departure of founding drummer Danny Seraphine had made way for the band's "great new drummer" Tris Imboden. Session player John Keane played the majority of this album's drum tracks. Their touring guitarist since 1986, Dawayne Bailey, performed as an extra guitarist for Twenty 1s sessions.

The band retained producer Ron Nevison, who'd already done Chicago 19. According to Nevison, work on the album was somewhat fragmented, with the band members rarely being in the studio together, and with work continuing with session musicians while the band was on tour. The fragmentation was furthered when Humberto Gatica was assigned to mix the final version of the album without Nevison's input.

Although the music for Twenty 1 was considered commercially viable, the shifting of popular musical trends toward the impending grunge movement is said to have lost Chicago some valuable radio support. Nevison maintains that if his original mixes had been used, he'd have been much happier and the album could have theoretically been more successful: "It all would have worked if they’d left it alone. I promise you." The single "Chasin' the Wind" peaked at No. 39 and Twenty 1 peaked at #66 during its eleven-week period on the charts, making it their second least successful non-greatest hits album, only behind Chicago XIV.

For what was intended to be the band's twenty-second album, Stone of Sisyphus, Chicago hired producer Peter Wolf to develop what could be considered a more ambitious and experimental effort. That 1994 release was indefinitely postponed, and then finally released more than fourteen years later on June 17, 2008 as Chicago XXXII: Stone of Sisyphus. A demo "Love Is Forever" from the Twenty 1 sessions was included on the Sisyphus release.

Three singles were released: "Chasin' the Wind" (B-side "Only Time Can Heal the Wounded") in January 1991, "Explain It to My Heart" (B-side "God Save The Queen") in April 1991, and "You Come to My Senses" (B-side "Who Do You Love") in August 1991. Twenty 1 would be Chicago's last full-length album release of original songs until Chicago XXX in 2006.

Reception 

Twenty 1 spent eleven weeks on the American Billboard 200, peaking at position No. 66, and did not chart in the UK.

Track listing 

Unreleased:
"Love Is Forever" was recorded during the Twenty 1 sessions and later released as a bonus track on Chicago XXXII: Stone of Sisyphus.
"Secrets of the Heart" remained unreleased, circulating unofficially online. This song was replaced by "Explain It to My Heart" on the final track list.
"Holdin' On" has been found online in demo form. This was recorded in 1988 with Bill Champlin's wife, Tamara, on lead vocals and Dawayne Bailey on guitars. "Holdin' On" was originally intended for Chicago 19.

Personnel

Chicago 
 Dawayne Bailey – guitars, backing vocals
 Bill Champlin – keyboards, lead and backing vocals, brass arrangements (11)
 Tris Imboden – drums, percussion
 Robert Lamm – keyboards, lead and backing vocals, brass arrangements (6)
 Lee Loughnane – trumpet, flugelhorn, backing vocals, brass arrangements (1-9, 11, 12)
 James Pankow – trombone, backing vocals, brass arrangements (1-9, 12)
 Walter Parazaider – woodwinds, backing vocals
 Jason Scheff – bass, lead and backing vocals

Additional personnel 
 Robbie Buchanan – keyboards
 Tom Keane – keyboards
 Efrain Toro – keyboards
 Steve Porcaro – keyboard programming
 David Foster – acoustic piano
 Michael Landau – guitars
 John Keane – drums
 Stephen "Doc" Kupka – baritone saxophone
 Jerry Hey – brass arrangements (10)
 Dennis Matkosky – co-brass arrangements (11)

Production 
 Humberto Gatica – producer and engineer track No. 1, mixing
 Ron Nevison – producer and engineer tracks Nos. 2–12
 Jim Mitchell – assistant engineer
 Jeff Poe – assistant engineer
 Alex Rodriguez – additional engineer
 Recorded at Record Plant (Hollywood, CA); Can-Am Recorders (Tarzana, CA); Ground Control Studios (Santa Monica, CA).
 Deandra Miller – production assistant
 Chris Cuffaro – photography
 Kosh Brooks Design – art direction, design

Charts

References 

Chicago (band) albums
1991 albums
Albums produced by Humberto Gatica
Albums produced by Ron Nevison
Full Moon Records albums
Reprise Records albums